Liezel Huber and Lisa Raymond were the defending champions but chose not to play together. Huber partnered up with María José Martínez Sánchez, but lost in the first round to Daniela Hantuchová and Anabel Medina Garrigues, whilst Raymond played alongside Samantha Stosur, but lost in the second round to Kimiko Date-Krumm and Casey Dellacqua.

Ekaterina Makarova and Elena Vesnina won the title, defeating Nadia Petrova and Katarina Srebotnik 6–0, 5–7, [10–6] in the final.

Seeds

Draw

Finals

Top half

Bottom half

References
Main Draw

BNP Paribas Open - Women's Doubles
2013 BNP Paribas Open